Mollalı (also, Mollaly and Mollavellilar) is a village and municipality in the Barda Rayon of Azerbaijan.  It has a population of 2,568.

Notable natives 

 Sefiyar Behbudov — National Hero of Azerbaijan.

References

Populated places in Barda District